This is a list of the Australian species of the family Castniidae. It also acts as an index to the species articles and forms part of the full List of moths of Australia.

Synemon austera Meyrick, 1891
Synemon brontias Meyrick, 1891
Synemon catocaloides Walker, 1865
Synemon collecta Swinhoe, 1892
Synemon directa Westwood, 1877
Synemon discalis Strand, 1911
Synemon gratiosa Westwood, 1877
Synemon heliopis Meyrick, 1891
Synemon jcaria R. Felder, 1874
Synemon laeta Walker, 1854
Synemon leucospila Meyrick, 1891
Synemon magnifica Strand, 1911
Synemon maja Strand, 1911
Synemon nais Klug, 1850
Synemon notha Westwood, 1877
Synemon nupta Westwood, 1877
Synemon obscurella Westwood, 1877
Synemon parthenoides R. Felder, 1874
Synemon phaeoptila Turner, 1906
Synemon plana Walker, 1854
Synemon selene Klug, 1850
Synemon sophia (White, 1841)
Synemon theresa Doubleday, 1846
Synemon wulwulam Angel, 1951

External links 
Castniidae at Australian Faunal Directory

Australia